The 1972 All England Championships was a badminton tournament held at Wembley Arena, London, England, from 23–26 March 1972.

Final results

Noriko Takagi married and became Noriko Nakayama and Brigitte Potthoff married and became Brigitte Steden.

Men's singles

Section 1

Section 2

+ Denotes seed

Women's singles

Section 1

Section 2

References

All England Open Badminton Championships
All England
All England Open Badminton Championships in London
All England Badminton Championships
All England Badminton Championships
All England Badminton Championships